The Traffic Police is a specialized unit of the Sri Lanka Police responsible for overseeing and enforcing traffic safety compliance on roads and highways. It is headed by the Director of Traffic, in recent times a senior gazetted officer of the rank of Deputy Inspector General of Police (DIG). Therefore, the post is also referred to as DIG - Traffic.

History
With the enactment of the Motor Traffic Act of 1950, the Colombo Metropolitan Police identified the need for a unit for traffic control in the city of Colombo. This unit was formed in 1951 and was expanded in 1953 to cover the whole island with the establishment of the Traffic Police Headquarters.

Units
Administration of the unit is carried out by the Traffic Police Headquarters, while there is a Traffic Unit in all police stations island wide.

Duties
 Enforcement of traffic safety compliance
 Investigation of Motor accidents
 Piloting VIP transport details
 Traffic control during road closures

Uniform
Traffic police officers can be identified by the white colour peaked caps, cross belts and belts they wear on the standard police uniform.

See also
Highway patrol

External links and references

 Sri Lanka Police.
 Sri Lanka Crime Trends
 Duty of police to make roads safer for users - DIG, Traffic
 DIG Traffic

Traffic Police